Anglo Chinese School (commonly known as ACS) is a semi-government aided primary and secondary school in Jalan Melawis and Jalan Raya Barat respectively within the district of Klang. It is the oldest school in the state of Selangor and one of the oldest in Malaysia. ACS was founded and established on 10 March 1893, and officially opened by Sir William Hood Treacher.

The primary and secondary schools initially functioned together but were separated when enrollment in both schools increased. The primary and secondary schools are now housed in different buildings, separated by a canteen that is located within the primary school and is adjacent to the secondary school. In 2009, a new canteen was constructed for the secondary school. 

The school is commonly known in Malay as SRK Methodist ACS (primary) and SMK Methodist ACS (secondary) respectively. Students who have studied or are studying in ACS are known as ACS'ians.

History

1800s
In 1892, the Klang District Officer, Walter W Skeat and Loke Yew encountered obstacles when raising money for a school building. They were finally successful in renting the premises of Penghulu Mohid's house in Jalan Rembau to start the new school. ACS initial enrolment was 14 students, with one teacher. The school was officially opened by Sir William Hood Treacher in 1893.

In 1896, the school became a British public school. The school was later sent by the Episcopal Methodist Mission and it was named Anglo Chinese School in 1915. In 1920, the original building, which was made of wood, was almost completely destroyed by fire.

The following year, a new building was erected at Jalan Raya Barat, its present-day location. It was opened by Oliver Marks, a resident of Selangor. Sultan Alaeddin Sulaiman was also present at the opening of the school. That year, when Reverend Abel Eklund and his wife Ruth Eklund arrived in Klang, there were 15 female pupils in ACS.

1900s
On 24 May 1924, Ruth Eklund founded the Methodist Girls' School (MGS), an all-girls school located in the proximity of ACS. In 1922, the first batch of students took the Senior Cambridge Exams. Two years later, the new school magazine, called The School Review, was published. In 1925, The First Klang Scouts Troop was founded.

In 1941, a new building was built to accommodate the increasing enrollment. From 1942 to 1945, during the World War II period, the school became the head office of the Japanese army. In 1951, a new science laboratory was opened by Sultan Hisamuddin Alam Shah Alhaj. The whole school was renovated six years later. During the same year, the first Klang Boys' Brigade was founded with the assistance of Captain Peter Dawson and Reverend Ronald Buttler-White. In 1958,  Additional Mathematics, and Pure Sciences, which encompasses Physics, Chemistry, and Biology, were introduced to Form 4 (16-year-old) students.

In 1961, the ACS Old Boys' Association was registered, with Koh Liang Sih as president. In 1963, a new three-storey building was completed. It had 11 classrooms, one office, one teachers' lounge, and one Geography room. It was declared open by Captain Abdul Hamid, the Malaysian Minister of Education. In 1973, the Parent-Teacher Association (Malay: Persatuan Ibu Bapa dan Guru; PIBG) was founded in the school hall. The first chairman was Adam bin Haji Yunus.

A three-storey block with 11 classrooms, and another block of four storeys which houses a teachers' room, an office, and an air-conditioned library were completed in 1978. It was officially opened by Y.B. Dato' Musa Hitam, the Minister of Education of Malaysia at that time. By 1979, new Form Six classes were created.

In 1980, the Report Card Day was introduced, and in 1981, the Mini Canteen day was held for the first time. In 1983, the PIBG raised funds to build a bicycle court, a tennis court, a sepak takraw court, a basketball court and a foyer. Ten years later, a celebration was held to commemorate ACS's 100th anniversary in both primary and secondary schools. In 1997, the name of the primary school was changed to SRK Methodist ACS Klang, while the name of the secondary school remained the same.

2000s
In 2006, the nature society club and the school itself have faced a major problem, which was the trailer which is used by the club to store the collected recycle things caught fire. The school call the fire department to put off the fire but unfortunately the gates to enter the school compound were locked with heavy-duty chains and lock pad.

In 2007, ACS Secondary underwent a major refurbishment, including the exterior of the school, along with the classrooms and the corridors being repainted, and the toilet renovated. The fund which has been raised for the renovation is mostly deposited to the person's personal bank account.

In 2018, the secondary school celebrated the 125th anniversary of the school by organising a charity night to raise funds to build a multipurpose sports hall for students to utilise during co-curriculum sessions for sepak takraw, futsal, basketball, volleyball, and badminton among others.

In 2020, both schools shut down due to the COVID-19 pandemic in Malaysia at various time in the year. As such, both students and teachers had to resort to online learning to keep up with their educational semesters, resulting in the semester dates differing from previous years, affecting the national exam that was supposed to be held during the November-December term.

School anthem and crest

Anthem
In days of yore in Selangor, 
Our beloved school renowned, 
Became a beacon of truth and light 
In the hearts of all around, 
Here may it stand from year to year, 
An emblem of grand endeavour, 
God save our land and heaven bless 
Our ACS forever. 

Chorus

Sing ACS forever more; 
Our ACS forever. 
God save our land and heaven bless 
Our ACS forever. 

In your classrooms and playing fields, 
Our beloved teachers all, 
Great truths of life and love they taught 
Thro' the years we may recall, 
Our hearts are filled with gratitude, 
For care and loving nurture,   
God grant us strength to serve mankind, 
And our nation forever. 

Repeat chorus

Crest
The crest of both the primary and secondary school bares a resemblance, with the motto being the only difference. Each symbol found on the crest has its own meaning which reflects on the school and its core principles.

School buildings
In 2009, after the completion of a new canteen for the secondary students, the school was divided into a primary and secondary buildings with a steel gate between both. As such, the classes for each are kept separate from one another.

Primary school
There are 4 classes in each cohort at the primary school for students between standard 1 and standard 6. Since the school has two sessions: morning and afternoon, each classroom at the school is used by both sessions. There are 12 classrooms in total at primary school. Students are grouped according to academic achievement and placed in the following classes: 

Bestari
Harmoni
Kreatif
Maju

Secondary school

Sports 
The students in both schools are advised to be actively engaged in sporting activities. As such, they are divided into 5 different colour-based team, commonly called as "colour house" to compete with each other during the yearly sports day and cross country run. The colours are:

 Blue 
 Green
 Yellow
 Red
 Purple

In addition to sports day and the cross country run, students are also given the option to choose various sport activities as part of the school's co-curriculum system and regularly attend training or events pertaining to their chosen sport. Among the options available are basketball, football, volleyball, badminton, taekwondo, swimming, dodgeball, ping-pong, rugby, tennis, and hockey. In addition to participating in these sport, students are also allowed to compete among each other and among various schools within the district, state, and national level.

Head prefects

Notes

See also
 Anglo-Chinese School
 List of schools in Selangor

References

External links
 Official site 
 The Nature Society 
 Pusat Sumber SRK Methodist (ACS) Klang 

Educational institutions established in 1893
Methodist schools in Malaysia
Primary schools in Malaysia
Secondary schools in Malaysia
1893 establishments in British Malaya
Boys' schools in Malaysia
Publicly funded schools in Malaysia
Schools in Selangor